Dora Beatrice Serle (1875–1968), was an Australian painter. She was the president of the Melbourne Society of Women Painters and Sculptors from 1933–1934.

Biography 
Serle was born on 2 September 1875 in Melbourne, Australia.

She studied at the National Gallery school where she was taught by Phillips Fox, Jane Sutherland, and Walter Withers. She attended the Gallery School with her sister Elsie Barlow.

In 1902 Serle travelled to Paris, France, where she was exposed to the Impressionists, which influenced her subsequent work.

In 1910 she married the scholar Percival Serle (1871–1951). In 1922 she gave birth to their third child, Geoffrey Serle, an historian and Rhodes Scholar.

Serle was a member of the Victorian Artists Society, the Melbourne Society of Women Painters and Sculptors and the Lyceum Club.

She died on 10 September 1968 at Hawthorn, Melbourne.

Hacke Place in the Canberra suburb of Conder is named in her honour and that of her younger sister Elsie Barlow, the misspelling of their maiden name being gazetted in 1988.

Exhibitions 
 1943, from 1 December; Inclusion in a group show of ninety-one paintings and etchings with Arnold Shore, Max Meldrum, John Rowell, Jas. Quinn, John Farmer, Mary Hurry, Allan Jordan, Margaret Pestell, Dora Wilson, Isabel Tweddle, Aileen Dent, Murray Griffin, Geo. Colville, and Victor Cog. Hawthorn Library.

Legacy 
Serle's paintings are in the collections of the National Gallery of Australia and the National Gallery of Victoria.

References

External links 
images of Dora Serle's paintings on MutualArt
Dora Serle [Australian art and artists file], State Library Victoria

1875 births
1968 deaths
20th-century Australian women artists
19th-century Australian women artists
Australian women painters
19th-century Australian painters
20th-century Australian painters
Artists from Melbourne